Anthony Siddons (29 December 1941 – 6 April 2005) was an English cricketer.  Siddons was a right-handed batsman who bowled right-arm off break.  He was born at Lenton, Nottinghamshire.

Siddons made his first-class debut for Nottinghamshire against Somerset at the County Ground, Taunton, in the 1959 County Championship.  He made four first-class appearances for the county, the last of which came against Warwickshire at the Courtaulds Ground, Coventry, the 1960 County Championship. In his five first-class appearances, he took 8 wickets at an average of 33.25, with best figures of 4/37.  With the bat, he scored 36 runs at a batting average of 7.20, with a high score of 8.

He died at the place of his birth, on 2 April 2005.

References

External links
Tony Siddons at ESPNcricinfo
Tony Siddons at CricketArchive

1941 births
2005 deaths
People from Lenton, Nottingham
Cricketers from Nottinghamshire
English cricketers
Nottinghamshire cricketers